Portland Rosebuds was the name of two professional men's ice hockey teams in Portland, Oregon. Both teams played their home games at the Portland Ice Arena. The first Rosebuds are notable for being the first American based team to be allowed to compete for the Stanley Cup. The second Rosebuds are notable in that their roster was used to build the NHL expansion Chicago Blackhawks.

PCHA Portland Rosebuds

The first Portland Rosebuds played in the Pacific Coast Hockey Association from 1914 to 1918. The team was previously known as the New Westminster Royals, an inaugural member of the PCHA in 1911. The team moved to Portland due to poor attendance in New Westminster, British Columbia, and the availability of a larger arena in Portland. In 1916 the Portland Rosebuds won the PCHA championship and briefly held the Stanley Cup, losing it to the Montreal Canadiens in the 1916 Stanley Cup Final. Their win is memorialized on the Stanley Cup as "Portland Ore./PCHA Champions/1915–16" on the 1909 base ring, one of the permanent rings. Portland was the first United States-based team to participate in the Stanley Cup Finals. Portland suspended operations in 1918, and were replaced by the Victoria Aristocrats.

Season-by-season record
Note: GP = Games played, W = Wins, L = Losses, T = Ties, GF = Goals for, GA = Goals against

WHL Portland Rosebuds

The second Rosebuds team was born when the Regina Capitals moved to Portland for the 1925–26 WHL season. This was the final season for the Western Hockey League (WHL).

When the league folded, the Saskatoon players were sold to form the Montreal Maroons. Frank Patrick then negotiated the sale of the rest of the WHL players to the National Hockey League. The players were to be sold as three teams, one from the Victoria Cougars, one from the Rosebuds, and a third from the best players from Calgary, Edmonton and Vancouver. A deal was reached where the players of the Rosebuds were sold for $100,000 to form the new Chicago Black Hawks expansion franchise.

Season-by-season recordNote: GP = Games played, W = Wins, L = Losses, T = Ties, GF = Goals for, GA = Goals against

Head coaches
Pete Muldoon (1914-15)
Edward Savage (1915-18)
Pete Muldoon (1925-26)

Notable players
 Moose Johnson - 1952 Hockey Hall of Fame inductee
 Dick Irvin - 1958 Hockey Hall of Fame inductee
 Tommy Dunderdale - 1974 Hockey Hall of Fame inductee

See also
Portland Rosebuds players

References

 

 
Defunct ice hockey teams in the United States
Defunct sports teams in Oregon
Rosebuds (hockey)
Pacific Coast Hockey Association teams
Ice hockey teams in Oregon
1914 establishments in Oregon
1918 disestablishments in Oregon
Ice hockey clubs established in 1914
Ice hockey clubs disestablished in 1918